Ingenious is a one-off drama produced by Lime Pictures and written especially for CBBC by Jeanette Winterson. It premiered on BBC One.

Cast 

 Sally – Hannah Godfrey
 Spikey – Keaton Lansley
 Patch – Leah Sheshadri
 Genius – Amit Shah
 Gransha – Una Stubbs
 Lucas Summer – David Calder
 Derek Reckitt – Ian Puleston-Davies
 Samantha – Christine Tremarco
 Ma O'Blimey – Vicky Licorish
 Willie O'Blimey – Oliver Sawyers
 Wallie O'Blimey – Reece Douglas
 Raine Reckitt – Ellen Gallagher
 Royce Reckitt – Anna Bray
 Inspector – Emma Edmonson
 Reporter – Jude Vause
 Twin #1 – Harry Moss
 Twin #2 – Ryan Moss

External links

2009 television films
2009 films
British television films